Marco Rossi (born 23 September 2001) is an Austrian professional ice hockey player for the Iowa Wild of the American Hockey League (AHL) as a prospect to the Minnesota Wild of the National Hockey League (NHL).

Rossi grew up in Austria and moved to Switzerland in 2011 to further his career. He spent several years there, making his professional debut in 2018 with the GCK Lions of the Swiss League, the second tier of hockey in Switzerland. In 2018 he moved to North America and spent two seasons with the Ottawa 67's of the junior Ontario Hockey League (OHL). He led the OHL in scoring and was named the most valuable player of the league in 2019–20. Regarded as a top prospect for the 2020 NHL Entry Draft, Rossi was selected ninth overall by the Wild, and made his NHL debut in 2022. Internationally Rossi has played for the Austrian national junior team at the under-18 World Championships and World Junior Championships.

Playing career
Rossi first played hockey in his native Austria when he was 3 years old. At the age of 10 Rossi moved to Switzerland to further his career, and Feldkirch, his hometown, is close to the Austria–Switzerland border. At the age of 13 Rossi moved to Zürich again to help his career, with him and his father commuting two hours each way in order to allow Marco to stay at home and continue his education. He played in the junior system of Switzerland within the system of the ZSC Lions, frequently playing in older age categories. He made his professional debut in the 2017–18 season, playing 18 games and recording 7 points for the GCK Lions of the Swiss League, the second-highest league in Switzerland. After the season he was selected 18th overall by the Ottawa 67's of the Ontario Hockey League in the Canadian Hockey League Import Draft. He played 53 games with Ottawa in 2018–19 and scored 65 points, finishing fourth on the team in scoring, and had an additional 22 points in 17 playoff games. Rossi was named to the OHL Second All-Star Team as a result. Rossi returned to Ottawa for the 2019–20 season and led the OHL, and the entire CHL in scoring with 120 points in 56 games. He was awarded the Eddie Powers Memorial Trophy and CHL Top Scorer Award for leading the OHL and CHL in scoring, respectively, and was named the most outstanding player in the OHL, winning the Red Tilson Trophy, and was also named to the OHL's First All-Star Team. He was the first European player to lead the OHL in scoring (Stan Mikita, who was born in Slovakia and raised in Canada, did so in the 1958–59 season).

Heading into the 2020 NHL Entry Draft Rossi was regarded as a top prospect, and the NHL Central Scouting Bureau had him ranked as the sixth-best North American-based skater for the draft. He was selected in the first-round, ninth overall, by the Minnesota Wild. On 23 October 2020, Rossi was signed by the Wild to a three-year, entry-level contract. Five days later, he was loaned to the ZSC Lions until the start of NHL training camp. He held a Swiss player-license after having played most of his junior hockey in Switzerland, but only played one game for ZSC. The NHL delayed the start of the 2020–21 season until January 2021, and Rossi was invited to join the Wild's training camp prior to the season starting. However, he returned to Austria due to long-term complications from COVID-19; he had tested positive late in 2020 for the virus. Speaking about his battle with the virus, Rossi stated: "I’m thankful to God that he supported me. ... I’m just happy that I’m still alive."

Rossi started the 2021–22 season with Minnesota's minor league affiliate, the Iowa Wild of the American Hockey League. After playing 21 games in the AHL, where he scored 23 points, Rossi was recalled to Minnesota in January 2022, and made his NHL debut on 6 January 2022 against the Boston Bruins. He played two games in the NHL before returning to Iowa.

International play
The first International Ice Hockey Federation (IIHF) tournament Rossi played at was the 2017 World U18 Championship Division IB, the third tier of the tournament. He scored 8 points in 5 games, leading the Austrian national team in scoring and playing third overall. Rossi subsequently played at the 2018 World Junior Championship IA, the second tier at that level. With 5 points in 5 games he led the Austrian national junior team and finished tied for fifth overall. He returned to the under-18 level for the 2018 Division IB tournament, recording 7 points in 5 games to place second for Austria and tied for fourth overall.

Rossi served as Austria's captain during the 2021 World Junior Ice Hockey Championships. He went scoreless in four games, as Austria only scored one goal, losing all four games.

Personal life
Rossi is the youngest of three children of Michael and Claudia Rossi; he has two sisters, Estelle and Marielle. His father, Michael, played hockey for 20 years, mainly with VEU Feldkirch. He is in a relationship with Stefanie Prast, who was introduced to him by Estelle. Rossi does not drink alcohol and is a devout Christian: he and Prast pray together before every game.

Rossi is a fan of Red Bull Racing in Formula One.

Career statistics

Regular season and playoffs

International

Awards and honours

References

External links
 

2001 births
Living people
Austrian expatriate sportspeople in Canada
Austrian ice hockey centres
GCK Lions players
Iowa Wild players
Ottawa 67's players
Minnesota Wild draft picks
Minnesota Wild players
National Hockey League first-round draft picks
People from Feldkirch, Vorarlberg
Sportspeople from Vorarlberg
ZSC Lions players